The canton of Les Mées is a former administrative division in southeastern France. It was disbanded following the French canton reorganisation which came into effect in March 2015. It had 11,795 inhabitants (2012).

The canton comprised the following communes:
Le Castellet
Entrevennes
Malijai
Les Mées
Oraison
Puimichel

Demographics

See also
Cantons of the Alpes-de-Haute-Provence department

References

Former cantons of Alpes-de-Haute-Provence
2015 disestablishments in France
States and territories disestablished in 2015